was a Japanese food supply ship that served during the Second World War. Constructed for the transport of food-stuffs, Irako was eventually commissioned for other roles, including troop transport, munitions transport, and Pacific survey missions. The crew of Irako is honored, along with many other seamen, in Tokyo, Japan.

The ship was named for Cape Irago, at the tip of Atsumi Peninsula in Aichi prefecture.

Construction
She was built in 1937 under the 3rd Naval Armaments Supplement Programme, in preparation for the anticipated war with the United States. She was intended to supplement the Combined Fleet's existing food supply ship . Her design was similar to that of Mamiya, but she was smaller. Her warehouse was able to supply 25,000 men over two weeks. A sister ship, Kusumi, was planned in 1942 under the Modified 5th Naval Armaments Supplement Programme, but construction was cancelled after the start of the Solomon Islands campaign.

Service
Irako was completed and assigned to the Combined Fleet on 5 December 1941. In January 1942, she started sailing between the Japanese homeland (Kure and Yokosuka) to the front, including Saipan, Truk, and Davao. Starting in April of that year, she started sailing to Singapore from the Japanese mainland as well. In August, she started making what would eventually be 12 trips to Truk from the mainland.
 
On 5 July, she was assigned to the Southwest Area Fleet, where she underwent repairs, which were completed in August 1944. She was dispatched to Manila Bay soon afterwards with convoy Hi-71, arriving on 2 September. She was present for the air raid carried out by Task Force 38 on 21 September, saving survivors from the destroyer . She was decommissioned on 30 November 1945.

Ships in class

Footnotes

Books
 The Maru Special, Japanese Naval Vessels No.34 "Japanese Auxiliary ships", Ushio Shobō (Japan), December 1979, Book code 68343-34
 Collection of writings by Sizuo Fukui Vol.10, Stories of Japanese Support Vessels, Kōjinsha (Japan), December 1993, 
 Senshi Sōsho Vol.31, Naval armaments and war preparation (1), "Until November 1941", Asagumo Simbun (Japan), November 1969
 Senshi Sōsho Vol.88, Naval armaments and war preparation (2), "And after the outbreak of war", Asagumo Simbun (Japan), October 1975

Empire of Japan
Postwar Japan
Ships built by Kawasaki Heavy Industries
World War II naval ships of Japan
Auxiliary ships of the Imperial Japanese Navy
Ships sunk by US aircraft
1941 ships
Underwater diving sites in the Philippines